The Nommo are ancestral spirits revered by the Dogon people of Mali.

Nommo may also refer to:
Nommo (magazine), an American magazine
 The Nommo Award, a literary award for speculative fiction by Africans
Nommo Gallery, an art gallery in Kampala, Uganda managed by the Uganda National Cultural Centre
 A race/species in the Master of Orion III game universe.
 A jazz composition by Jymie Merritt